Carlos César Olmedo Pérez (born 18 June 1960) is a Paraguayan former professional footballer who played as a right midfielder. He played in Paraguay and México most importantly in Luqueño, Cerro Porteño and Monterrey. Olmedo was a member of the Paraguayan squad that competed in the 1979 FIFA World Youth Championship and was also part of the Paraguay national team that participated in the 1983 Copa América.

References

External links

1960 births
Living people
Paraguayan footballers
Paraguay under-20 international footballers
Association football midfielders
Paraguay international footballers
1983 Copa América players
Sportivo Luqueño players
Cerro Porteño players
River Plate (Asunción) footballers
12 de Octubre Football Club players
C.F. Monterrey players
Paraguayan expatriate footballers
Paraguayan expatriate sportspeople in Mexico
Expatriate footballers in Mexico